Qapanlı, Tartar may refer to:

 Qapanlı (larger), Tartar
 Qapanlı (smaller), Tartar
 Qapanlı, Azad Qaraqoyunlu
 Qapanlı, İrəvanlı